Hell Is is a compilation album by Alice Cooper. It was released in 2003 and featured many of his best-known songs of the late 1980s and early 1990s.

Track listing
 "Poison" - 4:30
 "House of Fire" - 3:45
 "Hell Is Living Without You" - 4:11
 "Bed of Nails" - 4:19
 "Only My Heart Talkin'" - 4:45
 "Hey Stoopid" - 4:32
 "Love's a Loaded Gun" - 4:11
 "Feed My Frankenstein" - 4:44
 "Hurricane Years" - 3:58
 "Lost in America" - 3:52
 "Stolen Prayer" - 5:34
 "It's Me" - 4:37
 "Cleansed by Fire" - 6:12
 "Fire" (Jimi Hendrix) - 3:01
 "Go to Hell" [Live] - 5:30
 "School's Out" [Live] - 3:53

References

Alice Cooper compilation albums
2003 compilation albums